Lisbeth Olsson is a Swedish microbiologist and a Professor in industrial biotechnology at Chalmers University of Technology in Gothenburg.

Early life 
On November 22, 1963, Olsson was born in Höör, Sweden.

Education 
In 1987, Olsson obtained her master's degree in Chemical Engineering from Lund University in Lund, Sweden. In 1994, Olsson acquired a PhD degree in Applied Microbiology from Lund University in Lund, Sweden.

Career 
In 1987, Olsson became an analytical chemist for Draco, a pharmaceutical company, for a year.
In 1994, Olsson began to work as a postdoctoral researcher at Technical University of Denmark (DTU) in Copenhagen, Denmark. In 2006, Olsson advanced her academic career and was appointed as a full professor at Technical University of Denmark. In 2008, Olsson was recruited to Chalmers University of Technology, where she started her own research group in industrial biotechnology. Her research focuses on design and use of microorganisms and enzymes in processes in which plant cell wall materials are converted to valuable fuels, chemicals, and materials. She also works in Wallenberg Wood Science Center, which aims to develop materials from wood. She leads the Nordic collaborative project HGBiofuels aiming to develop sustainable production of biofuels. Additionally, she is a technical advisor for Taurus Energy AB.

In August 2021 the Swedish Research Council appointed Lisbeth Olsson as the new Secretary General for the area of Research Infrastructures. The Swedish Research Council has five scientists serving as Secretary General in different areas. Each one has a high level of scientific expertise, contributing both knowledge and experience to the organisation. They are also are part of the Swedish Research Council’s management team.

Awards 
 Chalmers Foundation Award (2018)
 Charles D Scott Award (2018)
Elected as a member of Royal Swedish Academy of Engineering Sciences (2017)

References 

Swedish bioengineers
Women bioengineers
Living people
Academic staff of the Chalmers University of Technology
Technical University of Denmark alumni
Members of the Royal Swedish Academy of Engineering Sciences
1963 births